Ian Fraser Kilmister (24 December 1945 – 28 December 2015), better known as Lemmy Kilmister or simply Lemmy, was an English musician. He was the founder, lead singer, bassist and primary songwriter of the rock band Motörhead, of which he was the only continuous member, and a member of Hawkwind from 1971 to 1975.

A foundational force in the genre following the advent of the new wave of British heavy metal, Lemmy was known for his appearance, which included his signature friendly mutton chops, his military-influenced fashion sense and his gravelly rasp of a voice. It was once declared "one of the most recognisable voices in rock". He was also noted for his unique way of singing, which was once described as "looking up towards a towering microphone tilted down into his weather-beaten face". He was also known for his bass playing style and using his Rickenbacker bass to create an "overpowered, distorted rhythmic rumble". Another notable aspect of his bass sound was that he often played power chords using heavily overdriven tube stacks by Marshall.

Lemmy was born in Stoke-on-Trent and grew up between there, the nearby towns of Newcastle-under-Lyme and Madeley, and later the Welsh village of Benllech, Anglesey.  At a later point, Lemmy remembers living briefly at Gwrych Castle, Abergele. He was influenced by rock and roll and the early works of the Beatles, which led to him playing in several rock groups in the 1960s, such as the Rockin' Vickers. He worked as a roadie for Jimi Hendrix and The Nice before joining the space rock band Hawkwind in 1971, singing lead vocals on their hit "Silver Machine". In 1975, he was fired from Hawkwind after an arrest for drug possession. That same year, he founded Motörhead. The band's success peaked around 1980 and 1981, including the hit single "Ace of Spades" and the chart-topping live album No Sleep 'til Hammersmith.

Lemmy continued to record and tour regularly with Motörhead until his death on 28 December 2015 in Los Angeles, where he had lived since 1990. He was diagnosed with prostate cancer two days before his death. Alongside his music career, he had minor roles and cameos in film and television. He was known for his hard-living lifestyle, which included chain-smoking and daily consumption of large amounts of alcohol and amphetamine.

Early life 
Lemmy was born Ian Fraser Kilmister in the Burslem area of Stoke-on-Trent on 24 December 1945. When he was three months old, his father, an ex-Royal Air Force chaplain and concert pianist, separated from his mother. He moved with his mother and grandmother to nearby Newcastle-under-Lyme, then to Madeley. When Ian was 10, his mother married former rugby player George L. Willis, who already had two older children from a previous marriage, Patricia and Tony, whom Ian disliked. They later moved to a farm in the Welsh village of Benllech, with Lemmy commenting that "funnily enough, being the only English kid among 700 Welsh ones didn't make for the happiest time, but it was interesting from an anthropological point of view". He attended Ysgol Syr Thomas Jones, a comprehensive school in Amlwch, where he was nicknamed "Lemmy." It was later suggested by some that the name originated from the phrase "lemmy [lend me] a quid 'til Friday" because of his alleged habit of borrowing money from people to play slot machines, although Lemmy himself said that he did not know the origin of the name. He soon started to show an interest in rock and roll, girls, and horses.

At school, Lemmy noticed a pupil who had brought a guitar to school and had been "surrounded by chicks." His mother had a guitar, which he then took to school, and was himself surrounded by girls even though he could not play. By the time he left school, he had moved with his family to Conwy. He went on to work several odd jobs, including one at the local Hotpoint electric appliance factory, while also playing guitar for local bands such as the Sundowners and spending time at a horse-riding school. He saw the Beatles perform at the Cavern Club in Liverpool when he was 16, and then learned to play along on guitar to their first album Please Please Me. He also admired the sarcastic attitude of the group, particularly that of John Lennon, and later said of the group, "Brian Epstein cleaned them up for mass consumption, but they were anything but sissies. They were from Liverpool [...] a hard, sea-farin' town, all these dockers and sailors around all the time who would beat the piss out of you if you so much as winked at them. [...] The Rolling Stones were the mummy's boys—they were all college students from the outskirts of London. [...] The Stones made great records, but they were always shit on stage, whereas the Beatles were the gear."

Career

1960–1970: Early years 

In Stockport, Lemmy joined local bands the Rainmakers and then the Motown Sect who played northern clubs for three years. In 1965, he joined The Rockin' Vickers who signed a deal with CBS, released three singles and toured Europe, reportedly being the first British band to visit the Socialist Federal Republic of Yugoslavia. The Rockin' Vickers moved to Manchester, where they shared a flat together.

Leaving the Rockin' Vickers, Lemmy moved to London in 1967. He shared a flat with Noel Redding, bassist of the Jimi Hendrix Experience, and with Neville Chesters, their road manager. He got a job as a roadie for the band. In 1968, he joined the psychedelic rock band Sam Gopal under the name Ian Willis and recorded the album Escalator which was released in 1969. After meeting Simon King at a shopping centre in Chelsea in 1969, he joined the band Opal Butterfly, but the group soon disbanded, having failed to raise enough interest with their singles.

1971–1975: Hawkwind 
 See also Hawkwind (1970–75: United Artists era)

In August 1971, Lemmy joined the space rock band Hawkwind, who were based in Ladbroke Grove, London, as a bassist and vocalist. He had no previous experience as a bass guitarist, and was cajoled into joining immediately before a benefit gig in Notting Hill by bandmate Michael "Dik Mik" Davies, to have two members who enjoyed amphetamine. Lemmy states that he originally auditioned for Hawkwind as a guitarist, but on the morning of the Notting Hill gig, they decided not to get another guitarist. By chance, the bass player didn't show up and left his equipment in the van. He often said, "Their bass player was pretty much saying 'please steal my gig!' So I stole his gig." Lemmy quickly developed a distinctive style that was strongly shaped by his early experience as a rhythm guitarist, often using double stops and chords rather than the single note lines preferred by most bassists. His bass work was a distinctive part of the Hawkwind sound during his tenure, perhaps best documented on the double live album Space Ritual. He also provided the lead vocals on several songs, including the band's biggest UK chart single, "Silver Machine", which reached #3 in 1972.

In May 1975, during a North American tour, Lemmy was arrested at the Canadian border in Windsor, Ontario, on drug possession charges. The border police mistook the amphetamine he was carrying for cocaine and he was kept overnight in jail before being released without charge. The band and management were concerned that his arrest might stop the band from crossing back into the United States, even though he had been released without charge. They were also tired of what they saw as his erratic behaviour, so they decided to fire him.

He once said of Hawkwind: "I did like being in Hawkwind, and I believe I'd still be playing with them today if I hadn't been kicked out. It was fun onstage, not so much offstage. They didn't want to mesh with me. Musically, I loved the drummer, the guitar player. It was a great band.”

1975–2015: Motörhead 

After Hawkwind, Lemmy formed a new band called "Bastard" with guitarist Larry Wallis (former member of the Pink Fairies, Steve Took's Shagrat and UFO) and drummer Lucas Fox. Lemmy and Took were friends, and Took was the stepfather to Lemmy's son Paul. When his manager informed him that a band by the name of "Bastard" would never get a slot on Top of the Pops, Lemmy changed the band's name to "Motörhead" – the title of the last song he had written for Hawkwind.

Soon after, Wallis and Fox were replaced with guitarist "Fast" Eddie Clarke and drummer Phil "Philthy Animal" Taylor and with this line-up, the band began to achieve success. Lemmy's guttural vocals were unique in rock at that time, and were copied during the time when punk rock became popular. The band's sound appealed to Lemmy's original fans and, eventually, to fans of punk. Lemmy asserted that he generally felt more kinship with punks than with metalheads; he even played with the Damned for a handful of gigs when they had no regular bassist. Motörhead's success peaked in 1980 and 1981 with several UK chart hits, including the single "Ace of Spades," which remained a crowd favourite throughout the band's career, and the UK #1 live album No Sleep 'til Hammersmith. Motörhead became one of the most influential bands in the heavy metal genre. Their – and Lemmy's – final live performance was in Berlin, Germany on 11 December 2015 during the band's 40th Anniversary Tour.

Personal life 
At the age of 17, Lemmy met a holidaying girl named Cathy. He followed her to Stockport, where she gave birth to his son Sean, who was put up for adoption. In the 2010 documentary film Lemmy, he mentioned having a son whose mother had only recently reconnected with him and "hadn't got the heart to tell him who his father was." Later, during his time with The Rockin' Vickers, he slept with a woman in Manchester named Tracy; she had a son, Paul Inder, whom Lemmy met six years later. As an adult, Inder became a guitarist and occasionally joined Lemmy onstage.

Lemmy lived in Los Angeles from 1990 until his death in 2015, his last residence being a two-room apartment two blocks away from his favourite hangout, the Rainbow Bar and Grill.

In the 2005 Channel 4 documentary Motörhead: Live Fast, Die Old, it was claimed that Lemmy had slept with over 2,000 women. He later quipped, "I said more than 1,000; the magazine made 2,000 of it." Maxim had Lemmy at No. 8 on its top ten "Living Sex Legends" list, as they claimed that he had slept with around 1,200 women. He is featured in the book Sex Tips from Rock Stars by Paul Miles.

Dave Grohl, on his Probot website, describes musicians with whom he has worked. In his entry for Lemmy, he wrote:

Lemmy was well known for his heavy drinking. The documentary Motörhead: Live Fast Die Old stated that he drank a bottle of Jack Daniel's every day and had done so since he was 30 years old. In 2013, he stopped drinking Jack Daniel's for health reasons. During his time with Hawkwind, he developed an addiction to amphetamine and LSD, particularly the former. Before joining Hawkwind, he recalled Dik Mik, a former Hawkwind sound technician, visiting his home in the middle of the night and taking amphetamine with him. They became interested in how long "you could make the human body jump about without stopping", which they did for a few months until Mik ran out of money and wanted to return to Hawkwind, taking Lemmy with him.

In November 2005, he was invited to the National Assembly for Wales as a guest speaker by Conservative member William Graham. He was asked to express his views on the detrimental effects of drugs and called for the legalisation of heroin. He stated that legalisation would eradicate the drug dealer from society and generate money from its taxation, however hard this would be to accept.

Lemmy collected German military regalia; he had an Iron Cross encrusted on his bass, which led to accusations of Nazi sympathies. He stated that he collected Nazi memorabilia because he liked the way it looked, and he considered himself an anarchist or libertarian. He spoke against racism several times; indeed, there is a viral archival video of Lemmy consoling an aspiring 16-year-old black musician who enjoyed playing metal but was chastised by his father over it (because he considered it white man's music), and Lemmy encouraged the teen to pursue his passion despite his father's protests, vehemently denouncing Hitler and his policies on racial segregation in the process. As of February 2023, a single video of the archived recording has amassed 6.9 million views, and an excerpted Reddit post of the clip attracted more than 41,000 upvotes.You cannot be just one colour. If the bloody thing is ever gonna work out properly, then we all have to intermarry and screw each other blind and get to be coffee-ish.Lemmy said he was against religion, government, and established authority. In 2011, he identified as agnostic, saying: "I can find out when I die. I can wait. I'm not in a hurry." Jeff Hanneman, the founder of the thrash metal band Slayer, befriended Lemmy due to their shared fondness for collecting Nazi memorabilia. According to Keith Emerson's autobiography, Lemmy gave him two of his Hitler Youth knives during his time as a roadie for the Nice. Emerson used these knives many times as keyholders when playing the Hammond organ during concerts with the Nice and Emerson, Lake & Palmer before destroying them. Lemmy defended his collection by saying that if his then-girlfriend (who was black) had no problem with it, nobody else should.

Illness and death 

In December 2000, Lemmy's tour was cancelled when he was hospitalised in Italy with the flu, exhaustion, and a lung infection. He was hospitalised with extreme dehydration and exhaustion in Germany in July 2005. As he grew older, he consumed less alcohol and drugs because he suffered from diabetes and hypertension. In June 2013, it was reported that he had an implantable cardioverter-defibrillator fitted. His tour was cancelled in July 2013 due to a severe haematoma. He referred to his continuing drug use as "dogged insolence in the face of mounting opposition to the contrary". Towards the end of his life, he had to use a walking stick. He had started smoking at the age of 11. In August 2015, he said he had cut down his smoking habit from two packs a day to one pack a week. He was hospitalised with a lung infection in September 2015, after having breathing problems when performing onstage.

On 28 December 2015, four days after his 70th birthday, Lemmy died at his Los Angeles apartment from prostate cancer, cardiac arrhythmia, and congestive heart failure. Motörhead announced his death on their official Facebook page later that day. According to the band, his cancer had only been diagnosed two days prior to his death.

Lemmy's manager, Todd Singerman, later revealed:

Lemmy's doctor had given him between two and six months to live. Mikael Maglieri, owner of his nearby hangout of the Rainbow Bar and Grill, subsequently had a video game machine that Lemmy was fond of playing taken from the establishment and put in Lemmy's apartment so he could continue playing it from his bedside. Although his manager had planned to keep the news private until his eventual death, Lemmy strongly encouraged him to make the diagnosis public in early 2016, but he died before a press release could be drafted.

Funeral
Lemmy's memorial service took place at Forest Lawn Memorial Park, Hollywood Hills, on 9 January 2016. The service was streamed live over YouTube with more than 230,000 people logging on to watch, while others gathered at the Rainbow. His body was cremated following the funeral. His remains were placed in a 3D-printed urn shaped like his trademark cavalry hat and emblazoned with the slogan "Born to lose, lived to win". The piece was on display during his funeral and was later interred at Forest Lawn.

In March 2021, it was revealed that some of Lemmy's ashes were, by his own request, put into bullets and sent to his closest friends, including Whitfield Crane, Rob Halford, Michael Monroe, Doro Pesch and Riki Rachtman.

Tributes

In various media, additional tributes appeared from fellow rock stars such as Rob Halford, Dave Grohl, Ozzy Osbourne, Alice Cooper, Metallica, Scott Ian of Anthrax, and Black Sabbath guitarist Tony Iommi.

In 2005, the UK magazine Classic Rock presented Lemmy with its first "Living Legend" award. In a 2013 interview with the magazine, Lemmy said he had never expected to make it to 30, but he spoke very pointedly about the future, indicating neither he nor the band was obsessing about the end:

In February 2016, the Hollywood Vampires performed at the Grammy Award ceremony as a tribute to Lemmy. On 11 June, Download Festival paid tribute to Lemmy by renaming the main stage the "Lemmy Stage", and in the slot where Motorhead were due to play, there was a video tribute to Lemmy in which they played his music and his peers talked about him. On 17 November, Metallica released a tribute song titled "Murder One", named after Lemmy's frequently used amp. The song, from their album Hardwired... to Self-Destruct, depicts Lemmy's rise to fame. On 18 January 2017, Lemmy was inducted into the Hall of Heavy Metal History for being the creator of thrash metal. In 2017, the extinct crocodile relative Lemmysuchus was named after Lemmy. On 14 November 2016, asteroid 243002 was officially named 243002 Lemmy, complementing asteroid 250840 Motorhead, named after the band in 2014.

In 2018, Hawkwind recorded a new acoustic version of Lemmy's "The Watcher" (originally recorded on Doremi Fasil Latido, 1972) on the album The Road to Utopia with production, arrangement and additional orchestrations by Mike Batt and a guest appearance from Eric Clapton.

Collaborations 
Lemmy worked with several musicians, apart from his Motörhead bandmates, over the course of his career. He wrote the song "R.A.M.O.N.E.S" for the Ramones, which he played in his live sets as a tribute to the band. He also produced a Ramones EP and an album for Warfare entitled Metal Anarchy in which Wurzel guested on guitar, He was brought in as a songwriter for Ozzy Osbourne's 1991 No More Tears album, providing lyrics for the tracks "Hellraiser," (which Motörhead later recorded themselves and released as a single), "Desire," "I Don't Want to Change the World" and the single "Mama I'm Coming Home". Lemmy noted in several magazine and television interviews that he made more money from the royalties of that one song than he had in his entire time with Motörhead. After being diagnosed with Type 2 diabetes in 2000, for which he was hospitalized briefly, Lemmy again appeared with Motörhead at WrestleMania X-Seven playing WWE wrestler Triple H to the ring. Lemmy published his autobiography, White Line Fever, in November 2002. In 2005, Motörhead won their first Grammy in the Best Metal Performance category with their cover of Metallica's "Whiplash". In the same year he began recording an unreleased solo album titled Lemmy & Friends, which was intended to include a collaboration with Janet Jackson.

In 2014, he established his own recording label, Motorhead Music, to promote and develop new talent. Acts he signed to the label and helped develop include Barb Wire Dolls, Budderside, Others, and Phil Campbell and the Bastard Sons.

Film and television

Cameo appearances
Lemmy made appearances in film and television, including 1990 science fiction film Hardware and the 1987 comedy Eat the Rich, for which Motörhead also recorded the soundtracks including the title song. He appeared as himself in the 1986 The Comic Strip Presents... episode "More Bad News", along with fellow heavy metal musicians Ozzy Osbourne, the Scorpions and Def Leppard. In 1984, Motörhead were the musical guests on the TV show The Young Ones, in the episode "Bambi". He appears in the 1994 comedy Airheads (in which he is credited as "Lemmy von Motörhead"). Lemmy has a cameo in Ron Jeremy's 1994 pornographic film John Wayne Bobbitt Uncut as the discoverer of Bobbitt's severed penis. The appendage is thrown from the window of a moving car and lands at Lemmy's feet who exclaims: "Looks like a dick! Fucking hell! Ah well, it's not mine at least." The film's soundtrack also features the Motörhead song "Under the Knife".

He has also appeared in several movies from Troma Entertainment, including the narrator in 1996's Tromeo and Juliet and as himself in both Terror Firmer and Citizen Toxie: The Toxic Avenger IV. His last role was portraying the President of the United States in Return to Nuke 'Em High. He has a cameo role in the film Down and Out with the Dolls (Kurt Voss, 2001). He appears as a lodger who lives in a closet. He appeared on Down and Dirty with Jim Norton as the series DJ, and also wrote the theme music. He appeared in a 2001 advertisement for Kit Kat, playing violin as part of a string quartet in a genteel tearoom. In 2015, Lemmy appeared as a central figure in the Björn Tagemose-directed silent film Gutterdämmerung opposite Grace Jones, Henry Rollins, Iggy Pop, Tom Araya of Slayer and Eagles of Death Metal's Jesse Hughes.

Lemmy film
The 2010 rockumentary film Lemmy was directed and produced by Greg Olliver and Wes Orshoski. It consists of a combination of 16 mm film and HD video footage, produced over three years. It features interviews with friends, peers, and admirers such as Dave Grohl, Slash, Ozzy Osbourne, James Hetfield, Lars Ulrich, Kirk Hammett, and Robert Trujillo of Metallica, David Ellefson of Megadeth, Scott Ian of Anthrax, Alice Cooper, Peter Hook of Joy Division/New Order, Dee Snider, Nikki Sixx, Mick Jones of the Clash, Ice-T, Kat Von D, Henry Rollins, Lars Frederiksen of Rancid, Jim Heath of The Reverend Horton Heat, Slim Jim Phantom of the Stray Cats, Mike Inez, Joan Jett, pro skateboarder Geoff Rowley, pro wrestler Triple H, "Fast" Eddie Clarke, Jarvis Cocker, Marky Ramone, former Hawkwind bandmates Dave Brock and Stacia, and Steve Vai.

In video games
He was the main character in the 16-bit video game Motörhead, released for the Commodore Amiga and Atari ST in 1992. Lemmy also appeared as an unlockable character in the 2009 game Guitar Hero: Metallica. He also provided his voice for the 2009 video game Brütal Legend, voicing the Kill Master, a character designed and based on his surname and likeness. Lemmy was also the inspiration for the Mario character Lemmy Koopa, who made his first appearance in Super Mario Bros. 3. In the Victor Vran Downloadable content "Motorhead Through The Ages", there is a new "Lemmy's Outfit" armour. The other Motörhead bandmates' armour is also available. As an easter egg, a holographic woman in the final level of 2020's DOOM Eternal proclaims, "Lemmy is God!". The appearance of the character King Novik from the same video game is also loosely based on facial features of Lemmy. Deep Rock Galactic features one of Lemmy's hats as a cosmetic called "The Ace of Spades" with the description "In honor of a motoring head."

Equipment

Lemmy positioned his microphone in an uncommonly high position, angled so that he appeared to be looking up at the sky rather than at the audience. He said that it was for "personal comfort, that's all. It's also one way of avoiding seeing the audience. In the days when we only had ten people and a dog, it was a way of avoiding seeing that we only had ten people and a dog."

As a member of Hawkwind, Lemmy first used a Rickenbacker belonging to Dave Anderson. When Anderson failed to show up for a charity gig, Lemmy took his place. Following the departure of Anderson, Kilmister bought a Hopf Studio bass off Hawkwind synth player Del Detmar. He used Rickenbacker basses for most of his career. In September 1996, a Rickenbacker belonging to him was a featured part of the Bang Your Head exhibition at the Rock and Roll Hall of Fame in Cleveland, Ohio, US.

When asked about the appeal of the Rickenbacker instruments, Lemmy said "The shape. I'm all for the image — always. If you get one that looks good, you can always mess with the pickups if it sounds bad."

With Hawkwind Lemmy used a Selmer amplifier. With Motorhead, he got a Marshall Amplification 1992 JMP Super Bass Mark 2 bass stack from 1976, with a 4x15" and a 4x12" cabinet. In 2008, Marshall issued a model dedicated to Lemmy, the 1992LEM, which was available with the same cabinets Lemmy used.

Musical style

Lemmy described his style as "I play a lot of notes, but I also play a lot of chords. And I play a lot of open strings. I just don't play like a bass player. There are complaints about me from time to time. It's not like having a bass player; it's like having a deep guitarist.

Lemmy's unconventional playing style changed the dynamics of the group's rhythm section. Hawkwind drummer Simon King explained that "A lot of the time I play with [guitarist] Dave - he'll get into a kind of rhythmic thing and I'll follow him so you get this kind of percussion and rhythmic guitar thing going, so Lemmy can loon forward a bit because he's very much a front man and gives off a lot of energy, so he can get out front and play a sort of lead on bass which sometimes is very effective", and Motörhead drummer Taylor echoed the sentiment with "Onstage he's difficult to follow cos he's not really a bass player. There's no solid bass lines to follow. A lot of the time I play more with Eddie [Clarke] than with Lemmy, but he's out on his own because he is what he is."

Discography
 For releases with Motörhead see the Motörhead discography

Member of the Rockin' Vickers
 1965 – "Zing! Went the Strings of My Heart" / "Stella" (7" single)
 1965 – "It's Alright" / "Stay By Me" (7" single)
 1966 – "Dandy" / "I Don't Need Your Kind" (7" single)
 2000 – The Complete: It's Alright (compilation)

Member of Sam Gopal
 1969 – Escalator
 1969 – "Horse" / "Back Door Man" (7" single)

Member of Hawkwind
 1972 – "Silver Machine" / "Seven by Seven" (7" single)
 1972 – Glastonbury Fayre – contains "Silver Machine" and "Welcome to the Future"
 1972 – Greasy Truckers Party – contains "Born to Go" and "Master of the Universe" (10/11 Hawkwind tracks on 2007 re-release)
 1972 – Doremi Fasol Latido
 1973 – "Lord of Light" / "Born to Go" (7" single)
 1973 – "Urban Guerrilla" / "Brainbox Pollution" (7" single)
 1973 – Space Ritual
 1974 – Hall of the Mountain Grill
 1974 – "Psychedelic Warlords" / "It's So Easy" (7" single)
 1975 – "Kings of Speed" / "Motorhead" (7" single)
 1975 – Warrior on the Edge of Time
 1983 – The Weird Tapes (live and out-takes, 1967–1982)
 1984 – The Earth Ritual Preview EP (guest appearance as bass and backing vocals on Night of the Hawks)
 1985 – Bring Me the Head of Yuri Gagarin (live 1973)
 1985 – Space Ritual Volume 2 (live 1972)
 1986 – Hawkwind Anthology (live and out-takes, 1967–1982)
 1991 – BBC Radio 1 Live in Concert (live 1972)
 1992 – The Friday Rock Show Sessions (live 1986)
 1997 – The 1999 Party (live 1974)

Member of Robert Calvert's band
 1974 – "Ejection" / "Catch a Falling Starfighter" (7" single)
 1974 – Captain Lockheed and the Starfighters
 1980 – "Lord of the Hornets" / "The Greenfly and the Rose" (7" single)

Side projects and career-spanning groups
 1990 – Lemmy & The Upsetters – Blue Suede Shoes
 2000 – Lemmy, Slim Jim & Danny B (aka the Head Cat) – Lemmy, Slim Jim & Danny B
 2006 – The Head Cat – Fool's Paradise
 2006 – The Head Cat – Rockin' the Cat Club: Live from the Sunset Strip
 2006 – Lemmy – Damage Case (Compilation)
 2007 – Keli Raven & Lemmy Kilmister "Bad Boyz 4 Life" (single).
 2011 – The Head Cat – Walk The Walk… Talk The Talk

Band collaborations
 1978 – The Doomed (one-off performance at the Electric Ballroom, 5 September 1978). Bootleg recording with Dave Vanian, Captain Sensible, and Rat Scabies. Brian James had left The Damned and took the rights to the name with him.
 1979 – The Damned – "I Just Can't Be Happy Today" / "Ballroom Blitz" (with Lemmy on bass) / "Turkey Song" (7" single) – available as bonus track on the reissued Machine Gun Etiquette album
 1980 – The Young & Moody Band – "Don't Do That" (7" & 12" single)
 1981 – Headgirl (Motörhead & Girlschool) – St. Valentine's Day Massacre EP
 1982 – Lemmy & Wendy O. Williams – Stand by Your Man EP
 1985 – Producer for Warfare on the album Metal Anarchy.

Charity collaborations
 1985 – Hear 'n Aid
 1985 – The Crowd – You'll Never Walk Alone (Bradford City F.C. Fire Disaster)
 2011 – Emergency – Livewire + Girlschool + Rudy Sarzo vocals (Haiti Appeal)

Guest appearances
 1982 – Speed Queen (French band) – Speed Queen – backing vocals on "Revanche"
 1984 – Albert Järvinen Band – Countdown
 1986 – Boys Don't Cry – "I Wanna Be a Cowboy" (appears in the music video)
 1989 – Nina Hagen – Nina Hagen – guests on "Where's the Party"
 1992 – Bootsauce – Bull – guests on "Hold Tight"
 1994 – Fast Eddie Clarke – It Ain't Over till It's Over – guests on "Laugh at the Devil".
 1994 – Shonen Knife – Rock Animals – guests on "Tomato Head" single remix (Track 3 – "Lemmy in There Mix") – not the album track
 1996 – Skew Siskin – Electric Chair Music
 1996 – Ugly Kid Joe – Motel California - guest on "Little Red Man"
 1996 – Myth, Dreams of the World – Stories of the Greek & Roman Gods & Goddesses
 1996 – Skew Siskin – Voices from the War
 1997 – Ramones – We're Outta Here! – guests on "R.A.M.O.N.E.S."
 1999 – Jetboy – Lost & Found
 1999 – Skew Siskin – What the Hell
 1999 – A.N.I.M.A.L. – Usa Toda Tu Fuerza – guests on a version of AC/DC's "Highway to Hell"
 2000 – Doro – Calling the Wild
 2000 – Swing Cats – A Special Tribute to Elvis – guests on "Good Rockin' Tonight", "Trying to Get to You" and "Stuck on You"
 2001 – The Pirates – Rock Bottom
 2001 – Hair of the Dog – Ignite – guests on "Law"
 2002 – Royal Philharmonic Orchestra, Mike Batt and guests – Philharmania – guests on "Eve of Destruction"
 2003 – Ace Sounds – Still Hungry
 2003 – Skew Siskin – Album of the Year
 2004 – Probot – Probot – guests on "Shake Your Blood"
 2005 – Throw Rag – 13 Ft. and Rising – guests on "Tonight the Bottle Let Me Down"
 2006 – Doro – 20 Years – A Warrior Soul – guests on "Love Me Forever" and "All We Are"
 2007 – Meldrum – Blowin' Up The Machine – guests on "Miss Me When I'm Gone"
 2007 – The Warriors – Genuine Sense of Outrage – guests on "Price of Punishment"
 2007 – Keli Raven single "Bad Boyz 4 Life" (co-writer and guest vocalist)
 2008 – Airbourne – Guest actor on Airbourne's "Runnin' Wild" Music Video
 2008 – We Wish You a Metal Christmas – Run Run Rudolph
 2008 – Legacy – Girlschool album – Don't Talk to Me vocals, bass, triangle and lyrics.
 2009 – Guitar Hero: Metallica (video game) – "Ace of Spades" guest vocalist and unlockable playable character.
 2009 – Queen V – Death or Glory – guests on "Wasted"
 2009 – Brütal Legend (video game) – The Kill Master (voice)
 2010 – Slash – Slash – "Doctor Alibi" (vocals and bass)
 2011 – Michael Monroe – Sensory Overdrive guests on "Debauchery As A Fine Art"
 2012 – Doro – Raise Your Fist guest on "It Still Hurts"
 2012 – Nashville Pussy – Guest on Nashville Pussy's song "Lazy Jesus" on the re-release of the album "From Hell to Texas"
 2014 – Emigrate – Guest bass and vocals on track Rock City, from their album Silent So Long

Film soundtracks, tribute, wrestling and various artists albums
 1990 – Hardware: Original Soundtrack – contains "A Piece of Pipe" by Kaduta Massi with Lemmy
 1990 – The Last Temptation of Elvis: Blue Suede Shoes – contains "Blue Suede Shoes" by Lemmy & The Upsetters
 1994 – Airheads: Cameo on film and performing "Born to Raise Hell" on the soundtrack
 1997 – Dragon Attack: A Tribute to Queen – performs on "Tie Your Mother Down"
 1998 – Thunderbolt: A Tribute to AC/DC – performs on "It's a Long Way to the Top"
 1998 – ECW: Extreme Music – contains a cover of Metallica's "Enter Sandman"
 2000 – Bat Head Soup – Tribute to Ozzy Osbourne – performs on "Desire"
 2001 – WWF The Music, Vol. 5 – "The Game"
 2001 – Frezno Smooth: Original Soundtrack – contains a version of Twisted Sister's "Hardcore" by Lemmy
 2001 – A Tribute to Metallica: Metallic Assault – performs on "Nothing Else Matters"
 2002 – Rise Above: 24 Black Flag Songs to Benefit the West Memphis Three – performs on "Thirsty & Miserable"
 2002 – Metal Brigade – performs on "Good Rockin' Tonight" by Lemmy and Johnny Ramone
 2004 – Spin the Bottle – An All-Star Tribute to KISS – performs on "Shout It Out Loud"
 2004 – The SpongeBob SquarePants Movie – performs "You Better Swim"
 2004 – ThemeAddict: WWE The Music, Vol. 6 – "Line in the Sand"
 2005 – Numbers from the Beast: An All Star Salute to Iron Maiden – performs on "The Trooper"
 2005 – Metal: A Headbangers Journey
 2006 – WWE Wreckless Intent – "King of Kings"
 2006 – Flying High Again: The World's Greatest Tribute to Ozzy Osbourne – Performs "Desire" with Richie Kotzen
 2006 – Cover Me in '80s Metal (Fantastic Price Records) – Metal artists covering the hits of others. Performs AC/DC's "It's a Long Way to the Top"
 2006 – Butchering the Beatles: A Headbashing Tribute – Performs "Back in the USSR".
 2009 – Flip Skateboards Presents Extremely Sorry – Performs "Stand By Me" with Baron and Dave Lombardo.
 2010 – Danko Jones – Full of Regret – Stars in the music video along with Elijah Wood and Selma Blair
 2011 – Foo Fighters – White Limo – Stars in the music video
 2017 – Airbourne – It's All for Rock N' Roll – Videos of Lemmy appeared in the music video. Tribute to Lemmy

Videography

Video tape/laser disc
 1982 Live in Toronto – Castle Hendring
 1984 Another Perfect Day EP
 1985 Birthday Party
 1986 Deaf Not Blind
 1987 More Bad News
 1988 EP
 1988 The Decline of Western Civilization II: The Metal Years
 1990 Hardware (Lemmy was cast as a water taxi driver; and plays a recording of "Ace of Spades" for his passengers)
 1991 Everything Louder than Everyone Else

DVD
 1987 Eat the Rich
 1994 Airheads – cameo as "The Rocker"
 1997 Tromeo and Juliet – cast as Narrator, Troma pictures
 1999 Terror Firmer
 2001 Down and Out with the Dolls – as Joe
 2001 25 & Alive Boneshaker
 2001 WrestleMania X-Seven – performing Triple-H's entrance theme "The Game" live
 2001 Citizen Toxie: The Toxic Avenger IV – as a Tromaville citizen
 2002 Motörhead EP
 2002 The Best of Motörhead
 2003 The Special Edition EP
 2003 Charlie's Death Wish – as himself
 2004 Everything Louder Than Everything Else
 2005 Stage Fright  – also HD DVD 2007
 2005 Ringers: Lord of the Fans
 2005 WrestleMania 21 – performing "The Game"
 2005 Metal: A Headbanger's Journey
 2006 The Head Cat Live: Rockin' the Cat Club
 2006 Foo Fighters: Hyde Park
 2010 Lemmy
 2011 The Wörld Is Yours – bonus DVD

References

Citations

Sources

Further reading
 1981 Motörhead – Author: Alan Burridge, published by Babylon Books, 
 1994 The Illustrated Collector's Guide to Motörhead – Authors: Alan Burridge and Mick Stevenson, published by Collector's Guide Publishing, 
 2002 White Line Fever – Authors: Lemmy and Janiss Garza, published by Simon & Schuster, 
 2002 Lemmy: In His Own Words – Author: Harry Shaw, published by Omnibus Press, 
 2002 Motorheadbangers Diary of the Fans Volume 1 – Author: Alan Burridge, published by e-booksonline(uk)ltd,

External links

 Motörhead official website
 
 Interview with Lemmy Kilmister in Revolutionart magazine no. 22
 Profile for Lemmy's new band The Head Cat on Myspace
 "Lemmy’s Last Days: How Metal Legend Celebrated 70th, Stared Down Cancer" in Rolling Stone magazine
 "R.I.P. Lemmy Kilmister, Motörhead frontman dead at 70"—Obituary on Consequence of Sound

1945 births
2015 deaths
20th-century British guitarists
21st-century English male writers
20th-century English male singers
21st-century English male singers
Burials at Forest Lawn Memorial Park (Hollywood Hills)
Critics of religions
The Damned (band) members
Dead Men Walking members
Deaths from cancer in California
Deaths from prostate cancer
English agnostics
English autobiographers
English expatriates in the United States
English heavy metal bass guitarists
English heavy metal singers
English libertarians
English rock bass guitarists
Progressive rock bass guitarists
English rock singers
English male singer-songwriters
Guitarists from Los Angeles
Hawkwind members
Male bass guitarists
Motörhead members
People educated at Ysgol Syr Thomas Jones
People from Burslem
The Head Cat members
English anarchists